Jimi Solanke  (born July 1942) is a Nigerian film actor, dramatist, folk singer, poet and playwright.

Early life
Solanke graduated from the University of Ibadan, where he obtained a diploma certificate in drama.

Career
After graduation, Solanke moved to the United States, where he created a drama group called The Africa Review, focusing on African culture. Members of this group usually put on African clothing, specifically Yoruba costume. They performed in black African schools. Solanke established himself in Los Angeles, California, where his storytelling career began. He was described as a "master storyteller" by CNN.

In 1986, he returned to Nigeria with three members of the African Review group to work with the Nigerian Television Authority.
His reputation earned him the lead role in most of Ola Balogun's films. He was part of the team that made the film of Kongi's Harvest by Nobel Laureate Wole Soyinka.

Filmography
Kongi's Harvest (film)
Sango (film) (1997)
Shadow Parties (2020)

References

Living people
1942 births
Yoruba male actors
Nigerian male film actors
Nigerian male poets
Nigerian dramatists and playwrights
People from Lagos
Nigerian expatriates in the United States
University of Ibadan alumni
20th-century Nigerian actors
Residents of Lagos